Cohay is an unincorporated community in Smith County, in the U.S. state of Mississippi.

History
The community derives its name from alteration of the last two syllables of nearby Oakohay Creek. A post office called Cohay was established in 1915, and remained in operation until 1937.

References

Unincorporated communities in Mississippi
Unincorporated communities in Smith County, Mississippi
Mississippi placenames of Native American origin